The Lark is a 1952 play about Joan of Arc by the French playwright Jean Anouilh. It was presented on Broadway in English in 1955, starring Julie Harris as Joan and Boris Karloff as Pierre Cauchon. It was produced by Kermit Bloomgarden. Lillian Hellman made the English adaptation and Leonard Bernstein composed the incidental music. The two stars of the play reprised their roles in a 1957 television production of the play, as part of the anthology series Hallmark Hall of Fame. A different television adaptation aired in 1958 in Australia. There is another English translation by Christopher Fry.

Plot summary
The play covers the trial, condemnation, and execution of Joan, but has a highly unusual ending. Joan remembers important events in her life as she is being questioned, and is subsequently condemned to death. However, Cauchon realizes, just as Joan is burning at the stake, that in her judges' hurry to condemn her, they have not allowed her to re-live the coronation of Charles VII of France. The fire is therefore extinguished, and Joan is given a reprieve. The actual end of the story is left in question, but Cauchon proclaims it a victory for Joan.

1955 Broadway Production
The play premiered in Boston at the Plymouth Theater on October 28, 1955. The Boston Globe critic singled out Julie Harris's lead character as "inspired". The show then opened on Broadway at the Longacre Theatre on November 17, 1955, where it ran for 229 performances, closing on June 2, 1956. The opening night cast remained throughout the entire run, with the sole exception of Christopher Plummer whose character Warwick was taken up by Leo Ciceri.

Opening Night Cast

1958 Australian TV adaptation
The play was adapted for Australian TV in 1958.

Festival 
The play was included in the third season of Festival, a Canadian entertainment anthology television series.

Awards and honors

Original Broadway production

References

External links
 Entire play online translated by Christopher Fry (Varies slightly from actual printed version) (PDF format)

Plays by Jean Anouilh
Works about Joan of Arc
1952 plays
Compositions by Leonard Bernstein
Plays based on real people